Morral de Cabrafeixet is one of the highest mountains of the Cardó Massif, Catalan Pre-Coastal Range, Catalonia, Spain. Its NW side has an impressive escarpment visible from Highway N-340 approaching El Perelló from the north. This mountain has an elevation of 753 metres above sea level.

Balma de Cabrafeixet is a prehistoric site with cave paintings located right below the Morral de Cabrafeixet escarpment. The entrance to the cave has been closed with an iron bar door to prevent vandalism. Wild flowers and butterflies are abundant in this lonely, uninhabited area.

Getting there
One should take the road from El Perelló to Rasquera. After 7 km turn left at a sign saying Pintures rupestres. Take right after 2 km (unpaved road). At the T-junction, the road to the left leads to the Cabrafeixet cave and to a kind of cirque with an impressive sight of Buinaca. The road to the right leads up to the base of the Cabrafeixet escarpment and further on to breathtaking sights of other jagged peaks and valleys.

See also
Cardó Massif
Catalan Pre-Coastal Range
Mountains of Catalonia

References

External links
El Cabrafeixet

Mountains of Catalonia